Chebulinic acid is an ellagitannin found in the seeds of Euphoria longana, in the fruits of Terminalia chebula or in the leaves of T. macroptera.

References 

Ellagitannins
Benzoate esters
Pyrogallols